Alucita compsoxantha is a species of moth of the family Alucitidae. It is known from Zimbabwe.

References

Endemic fauna of Zimbabwe
Alucitidae
Moths of Sub-Saharan Africa
Insects of Zimbabwe
Moths described in 1924
Taxa named by Edward Meyrick